The following is a list of football stadiums in Norway, ordered by capacity. The minimum required capacity of the stadiums is 1,000.

Note that some stadiums used for lower-division football might have their capacity reduced if they were to be used in higher divisions, where higher standards could be required. For instance, only few arenas in lower divisions are all-seater stadiums. Moreover, as capacity crowds are rarely an issue in lower divisions, some of the figures are likely to be rough estimates.

Stadiums of a certain size as well as those hosting notable Norwegian football clubs are included. The main stadiums of all Norwegian towns and cities of more than 10,000 inhabitants are included.

A selection of former Norwegian football stadiums, which have been demolished or fundamentally redesigned, or that are not in use for football as of 2013:

 Krohnsminde (stands demolished)
 Kråmyra Stadion (demolished)
 Old Fredrikstad Stadion (demolished)
 Stavanger Stadion (not in use)
 Telenor Arena (redesigned, not in use)
 Voldsløkka Stadion (not in use)

References

See also
List of stadiums in the Nordic countries by capacity
List of European stadiums by capacity
List of association football stadiums by capacity
List of Eliteserien venues

 
Norway
Football
Stadiums